Jakub Hronec (born 5 September 1992 in Banská Bystrica) is a Slovak footballer who currently plays as a midfielder for ASK Mannersdorf. 

His former club was a Bulgarian giant Ludogorets Razgrad.

Career 
Born in Banská Bystrica, Hronec began his youth career at FK Dukla. At the age of 10 he moved from Baník Pezinok to Inter Bratislava.

Hronec joined the Birmingham City Academy in 2008, when he turned 16.

Ludogorets Razgrad
On 19 August 2011, Hronec joined Bulgarian Ludogorets Razgrad on a three-year contract for an undisclosed fee.

Two weeks later, Kaliakra Kavarna signed Jakub on a four-month loan deal. On 3 October, he made his Bulgarian A PFG debut, in their 3–0 loss against Slavia Sofia. He scored his first goal on 21 October, in a 3–2 away loss against Levski Sofia after a long-distance effort.

In January 2012, Hronec returned to Ludogorets, but was not able to establish himself as part of the first team.

References

External links 
 

Living people
1992 births
Slovak footballers
Slovakia youth international footballers
Slovak expatriate footballers
Association football midfielders
PFC Ludogorets Razgrad players
PFC Kaliakra Kavarna players
SK Dynamo České Budějovice players
MFK Dolný Kubín players
FK Dukla Banská Bystrica players
FC Petržalka players
Expatriate footballers in Bulgaria
Expatriate footballers in the Czech Republic
Expatriate footballers in Austria
First Professional Football League (Bulgaria) players
Sportspeople from Banská Bystrica